Johann Georg Haeselich (also Haselick; 30 August 1806 – 6 December 1894) was a German genre painter and lithographer.

Education
Haeselich studied the painting of nature with Gerdt Hardorff, who also taught Hermann Kauffmann in Naturstudien, and then continued his studies at the academies in Berlin and Dresden. In 1828 he went to Munich and entered the Academy of Fine Arts as a genre painter. He stayed in Munich until 1836 and was a member of the Hamburg art colony run by Andreas Borum. Journeying into the Bavarian mountains as well as to Tirol and Innsbruck he found the inspiration for the paintings that later made him famous. After returning to Hamburg he devoted himself to painting landscapes of the surrounding area, especially Holstein.

He was a member of the Hamburg art society, and is immortalized in the 1840 Künstler-Vereinsbild by Günther Gensler.

Notable works

 1841: Gut Grabau
 1845: In der Heide, Ölgemälde 31 x 37 cm, Hamburger Kunsthalle, Inv. Nr. 3191
 1847: Holsteinischer See, Mondschein 
 um 1850: Weites Alpental in Öllgemälde (41,5 x 58 cm und unten links signiert)
 1853: Bauernhof am See (41 x 58,5 cm und rechts unten signiert)
 Am Alsterlauf ausgeführt als Ölgemälde (42 x 43 cm)
 Holsteinische Landschaft (40,5 x 57,5 cm. und signiert.)

Paintings

Auctions
 1926: Pferd. Blei (15 cm x 17 cm) von 1830, Aufruf durch Rudolph Lepke's Kunst-Auctions-Haus in Berlin 16 November 1926
 1926: Zaunstudie. Feder, von 1829, zusammen 4 Blätter, Aufruf durch Rudolph Lepke's Kunst-Auctions-Haus in Berlin 16 November 1926

Exhibitions
 1909: Ausstellung des Hamburger Künstlervereins mit seinen Werken

Further reading 
 Birte Abel-Danlowski: Das Naturvorbild bei Johann Georg Haeselich <1806-1894>.  Univ., Magisterarbeit - Hamburg 1997

References

External links
 

1806 births
1894 deaths
German male painters
German lithographers
19th-century German painters
19th-century German male artists